Brivaracetam, sold under the brand names Briviact and Brivajoy among others, a chemical analog of levetiracetam, is a racetam derivative with anticonvulsant (antiepileptic) properties. It is marketed by the pharmaceutical company UCB.

It is available as a generic medication.

Medical uses
Brivaracetam is used to treat partial-onset seizures with or without secondary generalisation, in combination with other antiepileptic drugs. No data are available for its effectiveness and safety in people younger than 16 years of age.

Adverse effects
The most common adverse effects include sleepiness, dizziness, nausea and vomiting. More rarely, coordination problems and changes in behaviour (such as severe depression, aggression, hostility, impatience, rage, depression, suicide ideology, etc.) can occur.

Interactions 

Coadministration of brivaracetam with carbamazepine may increase exposure to carbamazepine-epoxide, the active metabolite of carbamazepine, and could theoretically lead to reduced tolerability. Coadministration of brivaracetam with phenytoin may increase phenytoin levels. Coadministration of other antiseizure drugs are unlikely to affect brivaracetam exposure. Brivaracetam provides no added therapeutic benefit when administered in conjunction with levetiracetam that acts on the same protein.

Pharmacology

Mechanism of action
Brivaracetam is believed to act by binding to the ubiquitous synaptic vesicle glycoprotein 2A (SV2A), like levetiracetam. but with 20-fold greater affinity. There is some evidence that racetams including levetiracetam and brivaracetam access the luminal side of recycling synaptic vesicles during vesicular endocytosis. They may reduce excitatory neurotransmitter release and enhance synaptic depression during trains of high-frequency activity, such as is believed to occur during epileptic activity.

Pharmacokinetics
Brivaracetam exhibits linear pharmacokinetics over a wide dose range, is rapidly and completely absorbed after oral administration, has an elimination half-life of seven to eight hours, and has plasma protein binding of less than 20%. It is extensively metabolized (>90%), primarily via hydrolysis of the acetamide group, and secondarily through hydroxylation mediated by the liver enzyme CYP2C19. The three major metabolites (hydroxy, acid, and hydroxyacid) are pharmacologically inactive. Brivaracetam is eliminated as urinary metabolites, with over 95% of a radioactive test dose recovered in the urine within 72 hours, including only 8.6% as unchanged brivaracetam.

Pharmacogenetics 
As noted above, brivaracetam is primarily metabolized by hydrolysis, via amidase enzymes, to an inactive metabolite. To a lesser extent, it is also metabolized by a minor metabolic pathway via CYP2C19-dependent hydroxylation. Individuals who have no CYP2C19 enzyme activity, "CYP2C19 poor metabolizers", will have a greater exposure to standard doses of brivaracetam. Because they are less able to metabolize the drug to its inactive form for excretion, they may have an increased risk of adverse effects. The most common adverse effects of brivaracetam therapy include sedation, fatigue, dizziness, and nausea. The FDA-approved drug label for brivaracetam states that patients who are CYPC19 poor metabolizers, or are taking medicines that inhibit CYP2C19, may require a dose reduction.

Chemical and physical properties

Brivaracetam is the 4R-propyl analogue of the anticonvulsant levetiracetam.

History
Positive preliminary results from stage III trials were recorded in 2008, along with evidence that it is around ten times more potent for the prevention of certain types of seizure in mouse models than its analogue levetiracetam.

On 14 January 2016, the European Commission, and on 12 May 2016, the U.S. Food and Drug Administration (FDA) approved brivaracetam under the trade name Briviact. 
The Drug Enforcement Administration (DEA) issued an interim final rule placing brivaracetam into schedule V of the Controlled Substances Act (CSA) effective 9 March 2017. , brivaracetam is not approved in some other countries. It was approved in Australia in August 2016. In Canada it was approved on 9 March 2016 under the trade name Brivlera.

Legality

Australia 
Brivaracetam is a schedule 4 substance in Australia under the Poisons Standard (February 2020). A  schedule 4 substance is classified as "Prescription Only Medicine, or Prescription Animal Remedy – Substances, the use or supply of which should be by or on the order of persons permitted by State or Territory legislation to prescribe and should be available from a pharmacist on prescription."

References

Further reading

External links 
 

Anticonvulsants
Carboxamides
Racetams
Propyl compounds